William Earle may refer to:

Bill Earle (1911–1983), Australian rules footballer
Billy Earle (1867–1946), American baseball player
William A. Earle (1919–1988), American philosopher
William Earle (athlete) (born 1941), Australian sprinter
William Earle (shipping), engineer and one of the founders in 1845 of Earle's Shipbuilding in Kingston upon Hull, England
William Earle (USS Merrimac), Acting Master of the US Civil War steamer USS Merrimac when it sank on February 15, 1865
William Earle , fictional character from the 2005 film Batman Begins
Major General William Earle (soldier) (1833–1885), British Commander at the Battle of Kirbekan
William Rawlinson Earle (c. 1703–1774), British Member of Parliament for Cricklade, Malmesbury and Newport, Isle of Wight
William Earle (MP) (1728–1774), British Member of Parliament for Cricklade
William Earle (Newfoundland politician) (1884–1968), Newfoundland politician
William Benson Earle (1740–1796), English philanthropist
William P. S. Earle (1882–1972), American film director
William Earle (slave trader), 18th century slave trader